Marsypophora dissimilipennis is a moth of the subfamily Arctiinae. It was described by Paul Dognin in 1892. It is found in Ecuador.

References

 Natural History Museum Lepidoptera generic names catalog

Lithosiini
Moths described in 1892